Cecil John Kinross VC (17 February 1896 – 21 June 1957) was a Canadian soldier in World War I. Kinross was a recipient of the Victoria Cross, the highest and most prestigious award for gallantry in the face of the enemy that can be awarded to British and Commonwealth forces. He was only nineteen when it was awarded to him, making him the second youngest Victoria cross recipient ever.

Early life
Kinross was born on 17 February 1896 at Dews Farm, Harefield, Middlesex. His father's family originated in Perthshire. He moved to Lougheed, Alberta with his parents and siblings in 1912.

Military career
Kinross was inducted voluntarily into the army at Calgary, Alberta, October 21, 1915 as a private in the 49th (Edmonton) Battalion,  Canadian Expeditionary Force. On 30 October 1917, at the Battle of Passchendaele during the First World War, Kinross performed an act of bravery for which he was awarded the Victoria Cross.

Kinross was wounded in the arm and head in 1917 and hospitalised at Orpington, England. He was subsequently presented with the Victoria Cross by King George V in March 1918.

Later life
Kinross returned to Alberta after the war and was given a plot of land in Lougheed,  He never married and he died at the Lougheed Hotel in Lougheed, Alberta on 21 June 1957, and is buried in the Soldier's Plot in the Lougheed Cemetery, Lougheed, Alberta, Canada.

Legacy
Mount Kinross, 2560m, 24 km NW of Jasper, Alberta, in the Victoria Cross Ranges in the Jasper National Park, was named after him in 1951.

His Victoria Cross medal is held by his family while the miniature is on display at The Loyal Edmonton Regiment Military Museum in Edmonton, Alberta.

References

Further reading 
Monuments to Courage (David Harvey, 1999)
The Register of the Victoria Cross (This England, 1997)
Scotland's Forgotten Valour (Graham Ross, 1995)
VCs of the First World War - Passchendaele 1917 (Stephen Snelling, 1998)

External links
 Cecil John Kinross' digitized service file
 Hillingdon Council memorial plaque to Cecil Kinross, VC
 Cecil John Kinross biography on DND's Directory of Heritage and History bio
 
 Canadian Great War Project

1896 births
1957 deaths
People from Harefield
Canadian World War I recipients of the Victoria Cross
English emigrants to Canada
Canadian Expeditionary Force soldiers
Canadian military personnel of World War I
Military personnel from Middlesex
Loyal Edmonton Regiment soldiers